The Hiller YH-32 Hornet (company designation HJ-1) was an American ultralight helicopter built by Hiller Aircraft in the early 1950s. Versions of the HJ-1 Hornet were built for the United States Army and the United States Navy in the early 1950s.

The Hiller Museum identifies the YH-32A, named the Sally Rand, as the first helicopter gunship.

Design and development

The Hiller HJ-1 Hornet was an early attempt to build a jet-powered helicopter using ramjets. Before that there had been experiments with the XH-26 Jet Jeep tip rotor pulse jets. The HJ-1 ramjet tipped rotor propels the rotor and the aircraft. Unlike a conventional helicopter, this mechanically simple design avoids the need for a tail rotor.

Unfortunately, the tip speeds on helicopter rotor blades are subsonic, and ramjets are inefficient at subsonic speeds due to low compression ratio of the inlets. Therefore, the Hornet suffered from high fuel consumption and poor range. Also, the vehicle suffered from low translational speeds, and the ramjet tips were extremely noisy. In the event of power loss, autorotation was found to be difficult due to the drag from the ramjet nacelles.

The vehicle exhibited powerful lifting capacity, and there was some hope for military uses, but the high noise, poor range, and high night-time visibility of the ramjet flames failed to attract sales.

Operational history
The HJ-1 was evaluated by the United States Army as the YH-32, and the United States Navy as the XHOE-1. In 1957 two YH-32s were modified as the YH-32A for trials as armed helicopters. All the fibreglass cockpit fairings were removed and the tail was modified. The tests were successful in proving the viability of the helicopter as a weapons platform, but due to marginal performance, no further conversions or orders were placed.  Also, versions were sent to the U.S. Army's DRC to be evaluated in one of their contests involving the research and development of a light weight, air droppable helicopter for air rescue and reconnaissance, and for a portable, easily put together, and fuel efficient 1 man observation and transport copter.  It was competing against the Jet Jeep and its pulse jets.  Overall the YH-32 won out over the Jet Jeep, but the concept was considered obsolete, and later the program was canceled.

Variants

HJ-1
Company designation, one prototype.
YH-32
United States Army, Similar to HJ-1 with two small v-shaped stabilizers, 14 built (2 prototypes and 12 production aircraft).
YH-32A
Two YH-32s modified for trials as an armed helicopter.
XHOE-1
Three HJ-1s for evaluation by the United States Navy in 1951.

Aircraft on display

 138652 – XHOE-1 on static display at the Udvar-Hazy Center of the National Air and Space Museum in Chantilly, Virginia.
 53-4663 – YH-32 in storage with the Classic Rotors Museum in Victorville, California.
 55-4965 – YH-32 in storage at the United States Army Aviation Museum at Fort Rucker in Ozark, Alabama.
 55-4969 – YH-32 on static display at the Museum of Flight in Seattle, Washington.
 55-4973 – YH-32 airworthy at Fantasy of Flight in Polk City, Florida.
 c/n 15 – YH-32 on display at the Classic Rotors Museum in Ramona, California.
 Unknown ID – HJ-1 on static display at the Hiller Aviation Museum in San Carlos, California.
 Unknown ID – YH-32A on static display at the Hiller Aviation Museum in San Carlos, California.

Specifications (YH-32)

See also

Notes

Bibliography
 Andrade, John. U.S. Military Aircraft Designations and Serials since 1909. Hinckley, UK: Midland Counties Publications, 1979. .
 Apostolo, Giorgio. The Illustrated Encyclopedia of Helicopters. New York: Bonanza Books, 1984. .
 Display information at Museum of Flight in Seattle, Washington.
Flight page 725 2 November 1956

External links

 Hiller Aviation Museum: The First 100 Years of Aviation
 National Air and Space Museum Hiller HOE page
 Video of Hiller HJ-1 Hornet hovering

Military helicopters
H-32 Hornet
Ramjet-powered aircraft
1950s United States helicopters
YH-32
Tipjet-powered helicopters
Aircraft first flown in 1950